Lizardo is a name of Spanish and Portuguese origin.

People with the given name
 Lizardo Alzamora Porras (born 1928), Peruvian politician
 Lizardo García (1844–1937), President of Ecuador
 Lizardo Garrido (born 1957), Chilean footballer
 Lizardo Montero Flores (1832–1905), Peruvian politician
 Lizardo Rodríguez Nue (fl. 1910–1930), Peruvian footballer

People with the surname
 Cristina Lizardo (born 1959), Dominican politician and academic
 Japoy Lizardo (born 1986), Filipino taekwondo practitioner, actor, and model
 Omar Lizardo (born c. 1974), American sociologist
 Tania Lizardo (born 1989), Mexican actress

See also
 Elizondo (disambiguation)
 Lisardo (born 1970), Spanish actor and singer
 Lizardo (disambiguation)

References